Ukraine participated at the 2015 Summer Universiade in Gwangju, South Korea. The team won 31 medals and ranked 8th.

Competitors 
Ukraine was represented by 138 athletes in 13 sports. Ukraine was not represented in badminton, baseball, basketball, diving, shooting, table tennis, and water polo.

Medal summary

Medal by sports

Medalists 
The medalists were presented awards by the Ministry of Education and Science of Ukraine for their achievements at the Games.

See also
 Ukraine at the 2015 Winter Universiade

References

Sources
 Country overview: Ukraine on the official website

Nations at the 2015 Summer Universiade
2015
2015 in Ukrainian sport